Triumph in the Skies II is a 2013 television drama produced by TVB under executive producer Tommy Leung. It is a direct sequel to TVB's 2003 blockbuster television drama Triumph in the Skies. It stars Francis Ng, Julian Cheung, Myolie Wu, Fala Chen, Ron Ng, Kenneth Ma, Nancy Wu, Elena Kong and Him Law.

A film adaptation Triumph in the Skies started production on August 6, 2014 and was released in 2015.

Plot
Samuel Tong (Francis Ng) resides in the UK to spend a long vacation following his wife's death. After encountering Holiday Ho (Fala Chen), a wanderer whose boyfriend died in an aviation accident, he ends his vacation early after finally making the cake thanks to the unintentional help from Holiday Ho that he once made for his deceased wife, Zoe (Myolie Wu), he returns to Hong Kong, and joins Skylette Airlines as a pilot to fly again. He meets Captain Jayden "Captain Cool" Koo (Julian Cheung), and the two exhibit two distinct personalities, with Sam being reserved and Jayden being a man who likes to attract attention.

Respectively, the two get emotionally entangled with Holiday, who arrives in Hong Kong to apply for pilot training (PPP—Pre-pilot Project). Moreover, Sam becomes a training captain to assess Jayden, leading to a competition between the two for both career and love.

Jayden's younger sister Summer Koo (Myolie Wu) is an aircraft maintenance technician, and she bears grudges against her brother due to an unhappy experience during her childhood. Samuel's younger brother Issac (Ron Ng), due to Summer physically resembling his sister-in-law Zoe, is unable to turn a blind eye on it and tries helps settle the dispute between Summer and her brother. Summer has a crush on Issac, yet Issac restrains himself from taking another step forward in order to avoid evoking Sam's grief.

In the end, the misunderstanding causes Summer to think that she was only treated like Zoe (Sam's deceased wife) in Issac's eyes. First Officer Roy Ko (Kenneth Ma) has two girlfriends and cannot make up his mind as he does not bear to hurt anyone.  After sharing his secret with Heather Fong (Elena Kong), a senior purser, Roy and she become close associates, and the two even have a one-night stand.

Jim Jim (Him Law), who used to represent Hong Kong in swimming, plans to retire and enroll in flight training after noticing the pilot training (PPP—Pre-pilot Project) after returning from a FINA Aquatic World Championship, where he falls in love with CoCo Ling (Nancy Wu), who is to be a surrogate mother for her friend.

With the planes taking-off and landing, stories of sorrow, parting, joyfulness and re-encounters have been constituted.

Production

Development
In May 2011 Tommy Leung, deputy chief director of TVB's drama department, announced their plans to develop a sequel to Triumph in the Skies with intentions to begin filming in September of that year. Leung added that a theatrical film sequel would be made in the beginning of 2012, in hopes of boosting TVB artistes to become film stars.

In June 2011, it was reported at a TVB press conference that Michael Miu, Raymond Lam, Fala Chen, and Kate Tsui were in negotiations to join, with original cast members Ron Ng, Myolie Wu, Bosco Wong, Kenneth Ma, and Nancy Wu slated to return. Jessica Hsuan, at the time, submitted her name to be part of this series to work with Francis Ng and Chilam Cheung; but it did not work out as her contract with TVB had ended.

In July 2011, Ron Ng, Myolie Wu, Kenneth Ma, Nancy Wu, Fala Chen, and Kate Tsui were confirmed to film the sequel. Following the announcement, TVB pushed back the filming schedule from September 2011 to December 2011 due to negotiation problems with Triumph II'''s previous airline sponsor Cathay Pacific, which caused some of the newly signed cast members to withdraw, including Michael Miu.

To accommodate the schedules of Ron Ng and Kenneth Ma, whom were booked to film television drama Silver Spoon, Sterling Shackles from November 2011 to March 2012, TVB postponed Triumph IIs filming to May 2012. In September 2011, it was reported that Hong Kong Airlines replaced Cathay Pacific as the drama's main sponsorship.

In December 2011, TVB aired a sales promotional trailer for Triumph II to attract more sponsors, which included a surprise appearance by original cast member Francis Ng at the end of the trailer. Julian Cheung, who replaced Michael Miu's role in the trailer, was reportedly hired by TVB for 80,000 HKD per episode, and later confirmed his involvement in April 2012. Raymond Lam and Bosco Wong also appeared in the footage, but both backed out due to conflicting schedules. Rebecca Zhu was later confirmed to join the cast.

On 21 December 2011, it was reported that Francis Ng was in negotiations to return. To accommodate Ng's schedule, filming was postponed again to September 2012, and then moved forward to July 2012.

In May 2012, Kate Tsui revealed in an interview done in Australia that she had been pulled out of the cast to film a mainland Chinese drama instead. Following her announcement, Elena Kong and Kelly Fu were cast. On 23 May 2012, Next Magazine reported that Sammul Chan was in negotiations to return for a HK$25,000 per episode deal. Chan expressed an interest, but ultimately had to reject the offer due to a schedule clash.

A press conference was held on 18 July 2012.

Season 2 premiered on July 15, 2013.

Cast

 Music from Triumph in the Skies II 
Adele 《Crazy For You》

▶ Episode 1 / 2 / 12 / 16 / 22 / 32

Julie London 《Fly Me To The Moon》

▶ Episode 1 / 16 / 22

Adele 《Make You Feel My Love》

▶ Episode 2 / 16 / 23

Chris Winland & Daniel Finot 《Your Laws》

▶ Episode 2 / 10 / 29 / 37

Adele 《Chasing Pavements》

▶ Episode 4 / 9 / 11 / 13 / 16

Rob Bagshaw ft. Tara Chinn 《Smoking Gun》

▶ Episode 4

Patti Austin 《Say You Love Me》

▶ Episode 8 / 10 / 16 / 21 / * 30 / * 31 / * 32

Aaron Edson, Bruce Chianese, Geoff Levin 《We Can Do It》

▶ Episode 11

Peter Marsh 《Stop The Clock》

▶ Episode 12 / 13 (Old Bird) / 29 / 33 / 35 / 39

Billy Joel 《Just The Way You Are》

▶ Episode 12 / 27

林峰 Raymond Lam 《On My Way》

▶ Episode 15 / 16 / 20 / 22 / 24 / 25 / 26 / 30 / 31 / 32 / 33 / 34 / 36 / 39 / 41

Diana Ross 《Ain't No Mountain High Enough》

▶ Episode 16

Mark Britten 《Forever》

▶ Episode 16 / 20 / 22 / 23 / 37

Louis Armstrong 《La Vie En Rose》

▶ Episode 22 / * 32

Peter Marsh 《Changing Times》

▶ Episode 23

Peter Marsh 《Maybe You'll Change Your Mind》

▶ Episode 24 / 26

Peter Marsh 《Throw The Light Away》

▶ Episode 25

Chris Winland & Daniel Finot 《The Circus Of Life》

▶ Episode 26

Chris Winland & Daniel Finot 《Pop Song》

▶ Episode 27

Peter Marsh 《Next To You》

▶ Episode 28

Celine Dion 《S'il Suffisait D'aimer》

▶ Episode 31 / 32 / 33 / 41

《Eternally Yours》

Writer : Tim Ellis

▶ Episode 30 / 31 / 35 & 40

Andy Powell 《I Just Want To Be Here》

▶ Episode 31 / 32 / 33 / 40 (For All)

Peter Marsh 《Leave A Little Room For Me》

▶ Episode 32

《No Don't Cry》

▶ Episode 32 / 34 & 39

《Dry Your Eyes》

Writer : Tim Ellis

▶ Episode 32

Airport filming locations

Some scenes are filmed at or near airports that Skylette flies to:

 Hong Kong International Airport
 Sanya Phoenix International Airport
 Kaohsiung International Airport

Pilot training scenes are from Aeros Flight Training at Coventry Airport.

Aircraft

Hong Kong Airlines A330-200 (leased from Hainan Airlines) B-LNJ were featured in some close-up shots.

Most cabin scenes are filmed at TVB sets and most cockpit scenes are either on board the A330 or the A330 simulator.

Awards and nominationsTVB Awards Presentation 2013'''
 Won — Best Drama
 Nominated — Best Actor (Francis Ng) - Top 5
 Nominated — Best Actor (Julian Cheung) - Top 5
 Nominated — Best Actress (Myolie Wu)
 Nominated — Best Actress (Fala Chen) - Top 5
 Nominated — Best Supporting Actor (Ron Ng) - Top 5
 Nominated — Best Supporting Actor (Kenneth Ma) - Top 5
 Nominated — Best Supporting Actress (Nancy Wu) - Top 5
 Won — Best Supporting Actress (Elena Kong)
 Nominated — My Favourite Male Character (Francis Ng)
 Won — My Favourite Male Character (Julian Cheung)
 Nominated — My Favourite Male Character (Ron Ng)
 Nominated — My Favourite Female Character (Myolie Wu) - Top 5
 Nominated — My Favourite Female Character (Fala Chen) - Top 5
 Nominated — My Favourite Female Character (Nancy Wu)
 Nominated — Most Improved Male Artiste (Him Law) - Top 5
 Nominated — Most Improved Female Artiste (Oceane Zhu) - Top 5
 Won- Most Improved Female Artiste (Eliza Sam)

Viewership ratings

References

External links
 K-TVB.net English Synopsis and Episodic Thoughts

TVB dramas
Aviation television series
Hong Kong television series
Sequel television series
2013 Hong Kong television series debuts
2013 Hong Kong television series endings
Television series set in the 2010s
2010s Hong Kong television series